An interchromatin granule is a cluster in the nucleus of a mammal cell which is enriched in pre-mRNA splicing factors. Interchromatin granules are located in the interchromatin regions of the mammalian Cell nuclei. They usually appear as irregularly shaped structures that vary in size and number. They can be observed by immunofluorescence microscopy.

Interchromatin granules are structures undergoing constant change, and their components exchange continuously with the nucleoplasm, active transcription sites and other nuclear locations.

Research on dynamics of interchromatin granules has provided new insight into the functional organisation of the nucleus and gene expression.

Interchromatin granule clusters vary in size anywhere between one and several micrometers in diameter. They are composed of 20–25 nm granules that are connected in a beaded chain fashion appearance by thin fibrils.

Interchromatin granule clusters (IGCs) have been proposed to be stockpiles of fully mature snRNPs and other RNA processing components that are ready to be used in the production of mRNA.

See also
 Cell nucleus#Splicing speckles are subnuclear structures that are enriched in pre-messenger RNA splicing factors

References

Cell biology